Chaboksar (also romanized as Chāboksar and Chābuksār) is a city in Owshiyan Rural District, in Rudsar County, Gilan Province, Iran. It is located on south of Caspian Sea. At the 2006 census, its population was 7,891, in 2,270 families.

Climate
Chaboksar has a humid subtropical climate (Köppen: Cfa, Trewartha: Cf), with warm, humid summers and cool, damp winters.

References

Cities in Gilan Province
Populated places in Rudsar County
Populated coastal places in Iran
Populated places on the Caspian Sea